The Music Band – Jazz is an album by War, the fifth and final entry in their "Music Band" series, released on MCA Records in 1983.  It consists of outtakes from sessions for their 1979 albums The Music Band and The Music Band 2, and features several lineups of the band which existed that year.  War were no longer recording for MCA when this album was released, and no singles from the album were issued.  Track one was probably recorded/written  in 1979 when B. B. Dickerson was still in band and before Charles Miller was murdered. Track two could have been recorded/written  anytime  up to 1979.

The non-pictorial covers used in the Music Band series continued on this, and the previous volume, The Best of the Music Band (1982) which has a blue cover.  Unlike earlier volumes, the last two were not made with elaborate printing methods, but were manufactured using normal four colour printing, without metallic print, embossing, gatefolds or innersleeves.

Track listing

Side one
"Five Spot" (Papa Dee Allen, Harold Brown, B. B. Dickerson, Lonnie Jordan, Charles Miller, Lee Oskar, Howard E. Scott, Pat Rizzo) – 10:09
"Half Note" (Allen, Dickerson, Jordan, Miller) – 10:00

Side two
"E.R.A." (Allen, Brown, Ron Hammon, Jordan, Oskar, Luther Rabb, Rizzo, Scott) – 5:24
"Koronos" (Allen, Brown, Jordan, Oskar, Rabb, Rizzo, Scott, Jerry Goldstein)
"Sometimes I Wonder (Is It for Real) (Allen, Brown, Jordan, Oskar, Rabb, Rizzo, Scott)
"A Pattern of Time (Allen, Brown, Jordan, Oskar, Rabb, Rizzo, Scott, Goldstein) – 14:55 (total for tracks 2,3,4)

Personnel
Only the following names are credited on the cover, without listing instruments, which are taken from previous albums.
Papa Dee Allen – percussion, vocals
Harold Brown – drums, percussion, vocals
Ron Hammon – drums, vocals
Lonnie Jordan – organ, piano, synthesizer, guitar, percussion, vocals
Lee Oskar – harmonicas, vocals
Luther Rabb – bass, vocals
Pat Rizzo – saxophones, vocals
Howard Scott – guitar, vocals

Not credited, but likely appearing on side one, as they are in the composer credits:
B. B. Dickerson – bass, vocals
Charles Miller – flute, saxophones, vocals

Not credited, but appeared in most 1979 lineups, usually without composer credit, therefore possibly appearing on this album:
Alice Tweed Smith – vocals

Technical personnel
Jerry Goldstein and Lonnie Jordon in association with Sylvester (Papa Dee) Allen and Howard Scott – producers
Chris Huston – recording and remix engineer
Kevin Gray – mastering
Leon Tsilis – album coordinator

1983 albums
War (American band) albums
MCA Records albums
Albums produced by Jerry Goldstein (producer)